Anna Joubin-Bret (born 2 February 1962) is a French lawyer. She is the Secretary of the United Nations Commission on International Trade Law (UNCITRAL) and Director of the International Trade Law Division (ITLD) in the Office of Legal Affairs (OLA) of the UN Secretariat since 2017.

Education 
From 1979 to 1982, Joubin-Bret completed a B.A. in International Relations at the Institut d'Études Politiques (Sciences-Po) and a B.A. in Private Law at the University of Lyon III Jean-Moulin. In 1985, she obtained an M.A. in International Commercial Law and a Diplôme d'études approfondies in Private International Law at the Université Paris 1 Panthéon-Sorbonne.

Career 
Joubin-Bret started her career in 1983 as a junior counsel in the legal department of the Schneider Group. In 1984, she became general counsel for the French technology group KIS. From 1986 to 1994, she was the Director of the Export Division of the French cable car manufacturer Pomagalski S.A. She began working for the United Nations Conference on Trade and Development (UNCTAD) in Geneva, first as a consultant and later as Senior Legal Advisor from 1996 to 2011.

In January 2012, she was admitted to the Paris bar and became a partner in the Paris office of the US law firm Foley Hoag LLP, specializing in international commercial and investment arbitration. She set up Cabinet Joubin-Bret in May 2013 and from there acted as counsel and arbitrator in mediation and arbitration proceedings under ICC, ICSID and UNCITRAL rules. She advised governments in international investment negotiations and disputes.

In March 1998, she was elected Regional Counsellor for the Rhône-Alpes region. She served as judge at the Commercial Court in Grenoble (France). She was appointed on the list of Conciliators of the Chairman of the International Centre for the Settlement of Investment Disputes (ICSID) from 2010-2016 and on the list of arbitrators of several arbitration centers.

Joubin-Bret has taught commercial law at universities and institutes. She is the author and editor of numerous publications on arbitration, international trade and investment law.

In November 2017 Joubin-Bret became the ninth Secretary of the United Nations Commission on International Trade Law (UNCITRAL) and Director of the International Trade Law Division (ITLD) of the Office of Legal Affairs (OLA) of the UN Secretariat.

References

External links 
  Interview with UNCITRAL Secretary Anna Joubin-Bret (french), 6.April 2018

20th-century French lawyers
21st-century French lawyers
20th-century French women lawyers
21st-century French women lawyers
United Nations General Assembly officials
1962 births
Living people